Stenoptilia kirghizica is a moth of the family Pterophoridae which is endemic to Kirghizia.

References

Moths described in 2002
Endemic fauna of Kyrgyzstan
Moths of Asia
kirghizica